Under the Whyte notation for the classification of steam locomotives,  represents the wheel arrangement of two leading wheels, six coupled driving wheels and two trailing wheels. This arrangement is commonly called a Prairie.

Overview
The first 2-6-2 tender locomotives for a North American customer were built by Brooks Locomotive Works in 1900 for the Chicago, Burlington and Quincy Railroad, for use on the Midwestern prairies. The type was thus nicknamed the Prairie in North American practice. This name was often also used for British locomotives with this wheel arrangement.

As with the 2-10-2, the major problem with the 2-6-2 is that these engines have a symmetrical wheel layout, with the centre of gravity almost over the centre driving wheel. The reciprocation rods, when working near the centre of gravity, induce severe side-to-side nosing which results in intense instability if unrestrained either by a long wheelbase or by the leading and trailing trucks. Though some engines, like the Chicago and Great Western of 1903, had the connecting rod aligned onto the third driver, most examples were powered via the second driver and were prone to the nosing problem.

Usage

Australia

Queensland Railways operated one 2-6-2 tender engine of the B16 1/2 class. It was built in August 1918 by the North Ipswich Railway Workshops as an experimental engine burning coke instead of coal.  After nearly 9 years burning coke, it was converted to coal in 1927. The engine spent its working life on the Brisbane to Ipswich line working coal trains. It was withdrawn in February 1950.

In New South Wales a class of twenty engines, the Z26 class, formerly the (I)17 class, entered service in 1892 and operated until the end of steam. Two are preserved, no. 2606 at the Rail Transport Museum at Thirlmere and no. 2605 at the State Mine Museum in Lithgow.

The Silverton Tramway operated two  locomotives from 1891, both of which are preserved in South Australia.

The principal 2-6-2T locomotives which were built for the  narrow gauge system of the Victorian Railways (VR), are the now famous "Puffing Billy" engines. Two of these little locomotives arrived from Baldwin Locomotive works in 1898 and a total of seventeen saw service throughout the state on the various narrow gauge timber and gold lines, including the Wangaratta and Walhalla. When the VR determined to close the Upper Ferntree Gully to Gembrook narrow gauge route in the mid-1950s, the Victorian community refused to let the train die. Today, the Puffing Billy Railway has a fleet of saved and modified 2-6-2T engines on active steam roster and is one of Victoria's main tourist attractions.

Belgium
The Belgian State Railways ordered 91 inside-cylinder 2-6-2 tank engines between 1878 and 1881 (Belgian State Railways Type 4) with large drivers and side tanks longer than the boiler. They hauled commuter trains and fast trains on short lines. Some of them survived the war and were used on local trains until 1930.

After World War I, the Belgian State Railways were desperately needing new engines in order to replace the ones that were lost or damaged during the war. They purchased 63 2-6-2 Saddle tank engines from the Railway Operating Division (Belgian State Railways Type 22, later SNCB Type 57) and used them for switching and light freight trains until the 1960s.

Germany
Tank locomotives with this wheel arrangement spread very quickly in Germany after the good Austrian experience with the Series 30. The Württembergische T 5, the Badische VI b and the Badische VI c as well as the saxon Sächsische XIV HT, all developed before the First World War, were successful designs, many locomotives of these series were used well into the 1960s. Only the prussian T6 was a bad design, the few examples were taken out of service shortly after the First World War. From 1928 the Deutsche Reichsbahn-Gesellschaft procured over 500 units of their class 64 standard steam locomotives. Private railways such as the Eutin-Lübeck Railway with locomotives 11 to 14 also procured tank locomotives with this wheel arrangement in the interwar period.
In contrast, the first tender locomotives were initially unsuccessful. The Oldenburgische S 10, which was delivered in three copies in 1916, was extremely uneconomical due to the boiler, which was badly matched to the steam engine, and was taken out of service after less than ten years. The Badische IV g from Baden was a downright faulty construction, neither performing well on flat ground nor on the Schwarzwaldbahn. The Baden State Railways gave away the five copies in 1918 in the course of deliveries after the Armistice of Compiègne to France. The French side also wanted to get rid of the locomotives soon and agreed to return them to Germany, which was again refused in Baden. They were finally retired in France in the early 1930s.

It was not until 1941 that the Deutsche Reichsbahn received prairie tender locomotives again. The series 23, which was procured in two prototypes, was to be procured as a passenger locomotive in up to 800 copies from 1941 as a replacement for the prussian P8, but the Second World War made these plans obsolete in favor of urgently required freight locomotives. After the war, both the Deutsche Bundesbahn with the DB class 23 and the Deutsche Reichsbahn in the GDR with the DR class 23.10 each procured a good 100 new prairie locomotives. However, due to structural change, the last units remained in operation for an average of less than 20 years and were taken out of service until around the mid-1970s.

Hungary

The Hungarian State Railways (MÁV) also ran three important classes of 2-6-2 tank engines.

Italy
The Ferrovie dello Stato Italiane (Italian State Railways) built the 151-strong compound FS Class 680 for express trains from 1907 to 1911. The FS Class 685, built in 271 units from 1912 to 1928, was its non-compound and superheated version, and proved very successful, to the point that all but 31 of the earlier Class 680 were rebuilt as 685 (bringing the size of the class to 391 locomotives).

New Zealand
A fleet of five tank engines, built by Manning Wardle of Leeds in England, were supplied to New Zealand in 1884-85. The private Wellington and Manawatu Railway (WMR) used them for construction, maintenance and local service work. Three were later taken over as the New Zealand Railways (NZR) WH class in 1908.

The second batch of Prairie locomotives was built to an order for the New Zealand Railways Department, with the initial order for ten being let to Nasmyth, Wilson and Company of Manchester, England. This later became the NZR V class which, due to political interference and their being overweight, did not go into traffic until 1890.

New Zealand's third batch of Prairie locomotives was ordered by the WMR in 1884. Their design was almost identical to that of the NZR V class, though they were slightly heavier. They could burn any light fuel, coal or wood as available, and entered service in 1886, soon after the WMR started operating. In 1908, with the purchase of the company by the NZR, they were also awarded the V classification.

In 1885, Baldwin Locomotive Works built New Zealand's fourth batch of Prairie locomotives. These were to become the NZR N class. Six were delivered in 1885 and were of an almost identical design to the previous, but altered to utilise off-the-shelf components supplied by Baldwin. In 1901, four more were built for the NZR, but these were fitted with piston valves actuated by Walschaerts valve gear. In 1891, two of these locomotives had also been built to the same design for the WMR. In 1908, with the purchase of the WMR by NZR, all of these engines were classified as N class.

Between 1894 and 1904, four similar engines were built by Baldwin for the WMR. In 1908, these became the NZR's NA class and NC class, with two units each.

The NZR's Addington Workshops joined the list of Prairie suppliers in 1889, producing the first of two NZR W class tank engines. These were followed between 1892 and 1901 with eleven similar NZR WA class tank engines.

Baldwin followed this up with ten similar NZR WB class Prairie tank engines in 1898.

In 1930-31, after nearly thirty years of 4-6-2 Pacific and 4-6-4 Baltic locomotive production, New Zealand dusted off its Prairie plans with the release into service of twenty-four NZR C class 2-6-2 locomotives, designed primarily for shunting and branch line work.

Poland

The H. Cegielski Metal Works in Poznań produced 122 OKl27 class  locomotives for the Polish State Railways (PKP) during the period between 1928 and 1933.

Between 1951 and 1954, Fablok built a series of 116 Ol49 class 2-6-2 tender locomotives for the PKP.

Romania
Romania designed the 131.000 Class to replace the older Hungarian MAV locomotives used on Căile Ferate Române (CFR) secondary lines. A total of 67 locomotives were built at Reşiţa Works between 1939 and 1942, numbered 131.001 to 131.067.

Russia & Soviet Union

In Russia, the 2-6-2 was the standard passenger locomotive. They were represented by the pre-revolutionary S (С) (Sormovskij) series and the post-revolutionary Su (Су) series locomotives, the latter of which appeared in 1928. The pre-revolutionary S-series locomotives had the characteristic pointed nose, absent on the Su locomotive. The suffix 'u' means  which translates as "strengthened" or "uprated". Several Su-series locomotives are preserved in working order. However, only one pre-revolutionary S-series locomotive is still around, number S.68. It is preserved at the Saint Petersburg railway museum.

The Su was the standard passenger engine on most mainline routes and it was only on the key trunk lines that the IS class 2-8-4, or later the P36 4-8-4, would be used. Therefore, the majority of passenger miles were hauled by an Su (Су).

Visually, the Su was the last true Russian-look design before the American influence of high running boards, bar frames and boxpok wheels became the norm. The Su retained such features as a clerestory skylight in the cab roof and handrails on the outside of the running board. These handrails were a result of the harsh Russian winters, when ice would build up on the running boards, making them highly dangerous. Enginemen had fallen to their death from moving trains and the fitting of promenade deck style handrails was a safety measure ordered by the Tsar in pre-revolutionary times. These features, combined with the high  loading gauge, combined to give the locomotives a uniquely Russian appearance.

South Africa
The world's first 2-6-2 Prairie type locomotives were also the first locomotives to enter service on the new Cape gauge mainline of the Cape Government Railways. They were 2-6-2 side-tank engines that were delivered between 1875 and 1879. Four-wheeled tenders were also acquired on a subsequent order and the locomotives could be operated in either a tank or tank-and-tender configuration, as circumstances demanded. These locomotives were later designated the Cape 2nd Class.

In 1901, the Zululand Railway Company, contracted for the construction of the Natal North Coast line from Verulam to the Tugela River, acquired one 2-6-2 side-tank locomotive as construction engine from Baldwin Locomotive Works. Upon completion of the line in 1903, the locomotive was taken onto the roster of the Natal Government Railways and was designated Class I.

The first four Prairie locomotives built for the Cape Government Railways (CGR) by Neilson, Reid and Company, later designated Class 6Z on the South African Railways (SAR), were placed in service in 1901, but they displayed the Prairie's tendency to be unsteady at speed. They were therefore soon modified to a 2-6-4 Adriatic wheel arrangement.

With an improved design of bissel truck, two more CGR locomotives which were ordered from Kitson and Company in 1903 were once again built with a 2-6-2 Prairie wheel arrangement. These two locomotives did not display the tendency to sway at speed and therefore retained their 2-6-2 wheel arrangement. In 1912, when they were assimilated into the SAR, they were renumbered and designated Class 6Y.

Switzerland

Switzerland had four classes of  tank locomotives.
 The first was the Bodensee–Toggenburg-Bahn (BT) class Eb 3/5 (speed limit 75 km/h), of which nine were built in 1910 by Maffei, numbered 1 to 9. Seven were scrapped, no. 6 has been plinthed as a monument in Degersheim and no. 9, the only one with red trim, was preserved by the Dampf-Loki-Club Herisau in Bauma. By 2015, the Club del San Gottardo in Mendrisio began to restore them to working order.
 The second was the Swiss Federal Railways (SBB) class Eb 3/5 (speed limit 75 km/h), of which 34 were built from 1911 to 1916 by Swiss Locomotive and Machine Works (SLM), numbered 5801 to 5834. Of these, 31 were scrapped, no. 5810 was preserved by the Verein Dampfbahn Bern in Konolfingen, no. 5811 stands as a monument in Baden. By 2015, the Dampfgruppe Zürich in Brugg began to restore them to working order. No. 5819 was preserved by the SBB Historic in Brugg.

 The third was the class Ec 3/5 (speed limit 65 km/h) of the Lake Thun railway (TSB) and other railways of the Bern–Lötschberg–Simplon railway group (BLS). Six engines were built by SLM from 1905 to 1907, numbered 41 to 46. After electrification of the tracks in 1921/22, all six were sold to the Austrian Federal Railways and renumbered as class 130.
 The fourth was the Mittelthurgau-Bahn (MThB) class Ec 3/5 (speed limit 60 km/h), of which four were built in 1912 by SLM, numbered 1 to 4. Three were scrapped and no. 3 was preserved by the Verein Historische Mittel-Thurgau-Bahn in Romanshorn. It occasionally pulls the so-called Mostindien-Express.

In 1997, the MThB no. 3 was used as the prototype for the locomotive in the animated 20th Century Fox motion picture Anastasia, where it was given the appearance of a Soviet Union continental locomotive numbered 2747.

United Kingdom

Standard gauge

The first United Kingdom 2-6-2 tender locomotive was the unsuccessful prototype Midland Railway Paget locomotive of 1908. Thereafter, the wheel arrangement was rare on tender locomotives, with the exception of two classes on the London and North Eastern Railway. These were the Class V2 and Class V4 mixed traffic locomotives which totalled 186 locomotives between them.

In contrast, 2-6-2T locomotives were very widely used on suburban passenger services, particularly by the Great Western Railway (GWR), who built four main classes between 1903 and 1947. These include the 'Large Prairies' (5100, 3150 and 6100 classes), the 'Small Prairies' (4400, 4500 and 4575 classes) and the non-standard 3901 class rebuilt from 0-6-0 tender engines.

The Railway Operating Division received 70 2-6-2 Saddle tank engines built by Baldwin Locomotive Works in the United States. They were shipped to France and used near the front line. These engines, nicknamed "tortoises" were probably inspired by the Saddle tanks used on forest railways in the USA ; they had very small drivers and could run tight curves. After the war, all remaining engines (63) were sold to the Belgian State Railways. The rest was probably destroyed during the war and some of them may have been cannibalised for spares.

Sir Henry Fowler of the London Midland and Scottish Railway (LMS) introduced a successful  class in 1930, which became the basis of further similar classes by Stanier in 1935 and Ivatt in 1946.

Sir Nigel Gresley of the London and North Eastern Railway (LNER) introduced his V1 and V3 classes in 1930.

The last new 2-6-2T locomotives in Britain were the British Railways standard class 2, built between 1953 and 1957. The design derived from the earlier LMS Ivatt Class 2 2-6-2T.

Narrow gauge
The 2-6-2T layout was popular for large narrow gauge engines, but the design was modified to allow the use of a firebox much wider than the track gauge. A standard gauge 2-6-2T normally has inside frames and the firebox is placed between the second and third coupled axles. A narrow gauge one, on the other hand, has outside frames and the firebox is placed behind the third coupled axle and clear of the wheels. To minimise the rear overhang, the fuel is therefore carried in side-bunkers alongside the firebox, instead of in a rear bunker.

Preserved examples include the Welsh Highland Railway's Russell and the Vale of Rheidol Railway locomotives.

United States

Narrow gauge
The  gauge Sandy River and Rangeley Lakes Railroad in Franklin County, Maine, was a major narrow gauge  user.

Standard gauge
In the United States, the type evolved from the 2-6-0 (Mogul) configuration. The Atchison, Topeka and Santa Fe Railway (AT&SF) became a pioneer of the type in the United States in 1901 and one of the largest fleet users of the type. Problems the road encountered with the type included steam leakage in the compound cylinder plumbing and instability at speed. The former problem was solved by converting them to simplex two-cylinder locomotives; the latter problem required new 4-6-2 (Pacific) types with four-wheeled guide trucks. The Prairie types were rebuilt with smaller drivers for slightly slower fast freight service. These engines tended to enjoy very long service lives, and outlasted many a newer, more efficient steam locomotive on the Santa Fe and elsewhere. This was due to their modest weight, good speed and ability to operate well in reverse, which made them valuable for branch line operations.

More than a thousand examples of the 2-6-2 wheel arrangement existed in the United States. Of these, one hundred were high-wheeled engines with larger than  drivers. The Lake Shore & Michigan Southern operated locomotives with  drivers, but this did not overcome their inherent instability. They were never as successful in passenger service in the U.S. as they were in other nations.

References

 
 
Whyte notation